Shacsha, Shaqsha, (possibly from Ancash Quechua for jingle bell / a typical dancer of the Ancash Region), Huantsán Chico or Huanchan is a mountain in the Cordillera Blanca in the Andes of Peru, about  high, (other sources cite a height of ). It is situated in the Ancash Region, Huaraz Province, Olleros District. Shacsha lies southwest of Huantsán, west of Uruashraju and southeast of the town of Huaraz.

A nearby small lake to the west is also named Shacsha or Shacshacocha.

See also 
 Cashan
 Ranrapalca
 Huamashraju

References 

Mountains of Peru
Mountains of Ancash Region